Holoscotolemon is a genus of armoured harvestmen in the family Cladonychiidae. There are about eight described species in Holoscotolemon, found in Europe.

Species
These eight species belong to the genus Holoscotolemon:
 Holoscotolemon franzinii Tedeschi & Sciaky, 1994
 Holoscotolemon jaqueti (Corti, 1905)
 Holoscotolemon lessiniensis Martens, 1978
 Holoscotolemon monzinii Tedeschi & Sciaky, 1994
 Holoscotolemon naturae Tedeschi & Sciaky, 1994
 Holoscotolemon oreophilus Martens, 1978
 Holoscotolemon querilhaci (Lucas, 1864)
 Holoscotolemon unicolor Roewer, 1915

References

Further reading

 
 
 

Harvestmen